Marcus Vialva (born January 13, 1974), better known by his stage name Shabaam Sahdeeq, is an alternative hip hop artist from Brooklyn, New York. He first reached fame with Rawkus Records and was featured alongside artists including Busta Rhymes, Redman, Method Man, Kool G Rap, Common, Mos Def and Eminem. Shabaam Sahdeeq is notable for his work on the Soundbombing and Lyricist Lounge series in the late 1990s and the early 2000s. In 1998, Sahdeeq collaborated with DJ Spinna, Mr. Complex and Apani B to form the hip-hop collective Polyrhythm Addicts, a supergroup renowned for its pivotal role in the explosion of late 1990s indie hip-hop. The single "Not Your Ordinary: gained a positive critical and commercial reception, which paved the way for their first album, Rhyme Related, released in 1999, and widely regarded as a hip-hop classic. After this success, the group disbanded to focus on their individual careers. Sahdeeq's distinct voice and unique delivery catapulted him to mainstream stardom on the "Simon Says" Remix alongside label mate Pharoahe Monch. He is currently releasing music independently. Shabaam Sahdeeq's recent work has been receiving rave reviews in some of the biggest hip-hop publications.

Career
In 1999, Sahdeeq collaborated with DJ Spinna, Mr. Complex and Apani B to form the hip-hop collective Polyrhythm Addicts. A supergroup renowned for its role in the rise of late '90s indie hip-hop. The single "Not Your Ordinary" paved the way for their first album, Rhyme Related, which was released on June 9, 1999, was referred to as "saturated with quality from top to bottom". After this success, the group disbanded to focus on their individual careers.

In Sahdeeq's solo career, he featured alongside rappers Busta Rhymes, Redman, Method Man, Kool G Rap, Common, Mos Def and Eminem. His distinct voice and delivery led to mainstream success on the "Simon Says" Remix alongside label mate Pharoahe Monch. Sahdeeq is also recognized for his work on the Sound Bombing and Lyricist Lounge series. At this point he was in position to launch his solo album on Rawkus Records. Unfortunately do to the label's loss of distribution his solo project was never released and he would ask for a release from the label to solidify a new situation with the up and coming label Raptivism. In 2001 the artist re-emerged with the single "Bubbling" on Raptivism Records which received radio airplay. This track featured on his first solo LP Never Say Never.  Four years later he released the "solid but not earth-shattering" Strategize: The Mixtape Album.

Seven years after their first album, Sahdeeq re-united with Spinna and Complex, with Tiye Phoenix replacing Apani B. Fly Emcee, to bring out Breaking Glass. The Polyrhythm Addicts' long awaited second album was released on April 24, 2007 under Babygrande Records.

Discography

Source:

References

African-American male rappers
Living people
Rappers from Brooklyn
1974 births
21st-century American rappers
21st-century American male musicians
21st-century African-American musicians
20th-century African-American people